Wattegedara Grama Niladhari Division is a Grama Niladhari Division of the Maharagama Divisional Secretariat of Colombo District of Western Province, Sri Lanka. It has Grama Niladhari Division Code 532C.

Maharagama are located within, nearby or associated with Wattegedara.

Wattegedara is a surrounded by the Godigamuwa North, Maharagama West, Egodawatta, Boralesgamuwa East B, Godigamuwa South, Maharagama Town, Navinna and Pathiragoda Grama Niladhari Divisions.

Demographics

Ethnicity 
The Wattegedara Grama Niladhari Division has a Sinhalese majority (94.5%). In comparison, the Maharagama Divisional Secretariat (which contains the Wattegedara Grama Niladhari Division) has a Sinhalese majority (95.7%)

Religion 
The Wattegedara Grama Niladhari Division has a Buddhist majority (90.2%). In comparison, the Maharagama Divisional Secretariat (which contains the Wattegedara Grama Niladhari Division) has a Buddhist majority (92.0%)

References 

Grama Niladhari Divisions of Maharagama Divisional Secretariat